Spy vs. Spy II: The Island Caper is a 1985 video game. It is the sequel to Spy vs. Spy.

Gameplay

Spy vs. Spy II: The Island Caper adds a side-scrolling play area. Spies no longer start with a fixed number of traps but must collect the raw materials to build them

Reception
Steve Panak for ANALOG Computing wrote "you've got an action-packed game. Spy vs Spy II is a fantasy adventure recommended for all who enjoy a little harmless espionage."

Computer and Video Games stated "The cartoon graphics are every bit as good as on Spy vs Spy and, with seven levels of action, you'll find it a real challenge."

In a 92/100 review, Zzap! concluded "Fans of the original won't be disappointed."

Reviews
ASM (Aktueller Software Markt) - February 1986
Amiga Action - December 1989
Computer and Video Games - April 1990
Commodore Format - March 1994

References

External links
Review in Computer Gamer
Review in Compute!'s Gazette
Review in Commodore Microcomputers
Review in Commodore User
Review in GAMES Magazine

1985 video games
Amiga games
Amstrad CPC games
Apple II games
Atari 8-bit family games
Atari ST games
Commodore 64 games
First Star Software games
MSX games
Multiplayer and single-player video games
Nintendo Entertainment System games
Split-screen multiplayer games
Video game sequels
Video games based on Spy vs. Spy
Video games developed in the United States
Video games set on fictional islands
ZX Spectrum games